Degnepollvatnet or Deknepollvatnet (known locally as Polljavatnet) is a  lake in Kinn Municipality in Vestland county, Norway. The Norwegian national road 15 highway runs near the southern shore of the lake.

Degnepollvatnet is a popular spot for fishing and swimming during the summer. During the winter, the lake is widely used for ice skating, but the most recent winters have not provided adequate cold weather for it to freeze. The lake has been used as a source of drinking water.

See also
List of lakes in Norway

References

External links
 Norwegian Water Resources and Energy Directorate

Kinn
Lakes of Vestland